There have been four baronetcies created for persons with the surname Holland, one in the Baronetage of England and three in the Baronetage of the United Kingdom.

The Holland Baronetcy, of Quiddenham in the County of Norfolk, was created in the Baronetage of England on 15 June 1629 for John Holland. He represented Norfolk, Castle Rising and Aldborough in the House of Commons. The second Baronet sat as Member of Parliament for Norfolk. The title became extinct on the death of the third Baronet in 1729.

The Holland, later Holland-Hibbert Baronetcy, of Sandlebridge in the County of Chester, was created in the Baronetage of the United Kingdom on 10 May 1853. For more information on this creation, see the Viscount Knutsford.

The Holland Baronetcy, of Broughton in the County of Lancaster, was created in the Baronetage of the United Kingdom on 18 July 1907. For more information on this creation, see the Baron Rotherham.

The Holland Baronetcy, of Westwell Manor in the County of Oxford, was created in the Baronetage of the United Kingdom on 17 February 1917 for Sothern Holland. He was Trade Commissioner to South Africa from 1908 to 1914 and Director-General of Inspection of Munitions in 1916. The title became extinct on the death of the third Baronet in 1997.

Holland baronets, of Quiddenham (1629)
Sir John Holland, 1st Baronet (1603–1701)
Sir John Holland, 2nd Baronet ( – )
Sir William Holland, 3rd Baronet (1700–1729)

Holland baronets, of Sandebridge (1853)
see the Viscount Knutsford

Holland baronets, of Broughton (1907)
see the Baron Rotherham

Holland baronets, of Westwell Manor (1917)
Sir (Alfred Reginald) Sothern Holland, 1st Baronet (1876–1948)
Sir Jim Sothern Holland, 2nd Baronet (1911–1981)
Sir Guy Hope Holland, 3rd Baronet (1918–1997)

See also
Sir Nathaniel Dance-Holland, 1st Baronet

References

Kidd, Charles, Williamson, David (editors). Debrett's Peerage and Baronetage (1990 edition). New York: St Martin's Press, 1990.

Baronetcies in the Baronetage of the United Kingdom
Extinct baronetcies in the Baronetage of England
Extinct baronetcies in the Baronetage of the United Kingdom